Karmanovo (Qarman stantsiyahı) is a rural locality (a village) in Yanaulsky District, Bashkortostan, Russia. The population was 207 as of 2010. There are 3 streets.

References 

Rural localities in Yanaulsky District